Priyankara Silva (born 27 July 1975) is a Sri Lankan former cricketer. He played in 78 first-class and 36 List A matches between 1996/97 and 2009/10. He made his Twenty20 debut on 17 August 2004, for Burgher Recreation Club in the 2004 SLC Twenty20 Tournament.

References

External links
 

1975 births
Living people
Sri Lankan cricketers
Badureliya Sports Club cricketers
Burgher Recreation Club cricketers
Kalutara Town Club cricketers
Singha Sports Club cricketers
Sri Lanka Police Sports Club cricketers
Place of birth missing (living people)